The Château de Varax is a historic château in Saint-Paul-de-Varax, Ain, France. It was built in the 14th century. It was almost destroyed in 1593, and subsequently rebuilt. It has been listed as an official historical monument since September 29, 1981.

References

Houses completed in the 14th century
Châteaux in Ain
Monuments historiques of Auvergne-Rhône-Alpes